Ghungroo Ki Awaaz is a 1981 Bollywood Horror-Mystery Film directed by the Ramsay Brothers and produced by Vijay Anand. It features Vijay Anand, Rekha in the lead roles. The music was composed by R. D. Burman. It was loosely inspired by the Hollywood thriller Vertigo.

Plot
Thakur Ranjeet Singh buys Kajal's freedom from a panderer and installs her in his house with the status of a daughter-in-law, much to the disgust of his uncle, Jasbeer. When the sleazy Shakaal turns up and arranges a secret meeting with Kajal, Ranjeet believes that he has caught his beloved being unfaithful. He exacts a fearful retribution. Obligingly, Jasbeer destroys the evidence. Ranjeet finds himself being plagued by the restless spirit of Kajal as well as a suspicious policeman. Seeking respite in Bombay, he is stunned to see Kajal's doppelgaenger, a nurse called Kiran. Unnerved, he brings Kiran home with him and finds himself falling in love again. The mystery deepens when Kajal's vengeful spirit murders the usurper, sending Ranjeet over the edge and into an asylum.

Cast
 Vijay Anand as Thakur Ranjeet Singh
 Rekha as Kajal / Kiran
 Shreeram Lagoo as Jasbeer Singh "Mamaji"
 Leela Mishra as Damayanti "Dai Maa"
 Agha as Butler
 Iftekhar as Dr. Dixit
 Pinchoo Kapoor as Daroga
 Dheeraj Kumar as Shakaal
 Padma Khanna as Dancer
 Harindranath Chattopadhyay as Nawab Jung Bahadur

Soundtrack
Vijay Anand has written the lyrics of all songs and R. D. Burman has composed the music.

References

External links
 

1981 films
1980s Hindi-language films
Films scored by R. D. Burman
Indian horror thriller films